Bluebeard (Spanish:Los lios de Barba Azul) is a 1955 Mexican comedy film directed by Gilberto Martínez Solares and starring Germán Valdés, Amanda del Llano and Verónica Loyo.

Cast
 Germán Valdés as Ricardo  
 Amanda del Llano as Olga  
 Verónica Loyo  as Aurora  
 Lola Beltrán as doña Lola Bárbara Beltrán  
 Joan Page as Gringa  
 Famie Kaufman as Emeteria  
 Marcelo Chávez  as Marcelo  
 Rafael Alcayde as don Agustín  
 Rosalía Julián as María, sirvienta 
 Ramiro Gamboa as Nacho  
 Juan García as Director de periódico 
 Gregorio Acosta as Rosendo, chofer  
 Daniel Arroyo as Catedrático  
 Guillermo Bravo Sosa as Mayordomo  
 Pedro Elviro  as Empleado de don Agustín  
 Emilio Garibay as Hombre en cantina  
 Elvira Lodi as Secretaria  
 José Muñoz as empleado doña Bárbara 
 José Ortega as Hombre en cantina  
 Carlos Robles Gil as Invitado a boda  
 Humberto Rodríguez as Boticario  
 Nicolás Rodríguez as Hombre con pastillas  
 Hernán Vera as Gasolinero

References

Bibliography 
 Carlos Monsiváis & John Kraniauskas. Mexican Postcards. Verso, 1997.

External links 
 

1955 films
1955 comedy films
Mexican comedy films
1950s Spanish-language films
Films directed by Gilberto Martínez Solares
Films scored by Manuel Esperón
Mexican black-and-white films
1950s Mexican films